This is the results breakdown of the Congress of Deputies election held in Spain on 9 March 2008. The following tables show detailed results in each of the country's 17 autonomous communities and in the autonomous cities of Ceuta and Melilla, as well as a summary of constituency and regional results.

Electoral system
348 members of the Congress of Deputies were elected using the D'Hondt method and a closed list proportional representation, with an electoral threshold of three percent of valid votes—which included blank ballots—being applied in each constituency. Seats were allocated to constituencies, corresponding to the provinces of Spain, with each being allocated an initial minimum of two seats and the remaining 248 being distributed in proportion to their populations. Ceuta and Melilla were allocated the two remaining seats, which were elected using plurality voting. The D'Hondt method might result in a higher effective threshold, depending on the district magnitude.

As a result of the aforementioned allocation, each Congress multi-member constituency was entitled the following seats:

Voting was on the basis of universal suffrage, which comprised all nationals over eighteen and in full enjoyment of their political rights.

The electoral law allowed for parties and federations registered in the interior ministry, coalitions and groupings of electors to present lists of candidates. Parties and federations intending to form a coalition ahead of an election were required to inform the relevant Electoral Commission within ten days of the election call, whereas groupings of electors needed to secure the signature of at least one percent of the electorate in the constituencies for which they sought election, disallowing electors from signing for more than one list of candidates.

Nationwide

Summary

Constituencies

Regions

Autonomous communities

Andalusia

Aragon

Asturias

Balearic Islands

Basque Country

Canary Islands

Cantabria

Castile and León

Castilla–La Mancha

Catalonia

Extremadura

Galicia

La Rioja

Madrid

Murcia

Navarre

Valencian Community

Autonomous cities

Ceuta

Melilla

References

Bibliography

Congress
Congress